Itchy red bump disease is a cutaneous condition characterized by a red rash that may be treated with PUVA therapy.

See also 
 Eosinophilic vasculitis
 List of cutaneous conditions

References 

Eosinophilic cutaneous conditions